Levanjska Varoš is a municipality in Osijek-Baranja County, Croatia. There are 1,194 inhabitants, 85.8% of whom are Croats and 12.8% of whom are Serbs (2011 census).

References

Municipalities of Croatia